Stadion-Warthausen was a county located in around Warthausen in western Baden-Württemberg, Germany. Stadion-Warthausen was a partition of Stadion County, and was mediatised to Austria and Württemberg in 1806.

Counts of Stadion-Warthausen
 Anthony Henry Frederick (1741–68)
 Francis Conrad (1768–87)
 Johann Philipp (1787–1806) (Died 1824)
 Franz (1824–1853)

1806 disestablishments
States and territories established in 1741